Manfred Reiss (1922–1987) born in Leipzig, Germany, son of Golda & Menahem Reiss, Jews of Polish descent.  The Family moved to London in 1937, taking 40 local Jewish children along with them.

In London, Manfred pursued a successful career in Graphic Design. In the late forties and early fifties, he was one of the most prolific British poster designers. Many of his creations were reproduced in the International Poster Annuals, a selection of the best in international poster designs from this period . His major client was the Post Office Savings Bank. Reiss' posters are always cleanly designed and easy to understand, often composed of simple drawings with a photo-montage or simple photographed elements.

External links 
 St. Jude's Gallery - Address your letters correctly
 The key to prosperity - Post Office Savings Bank
 RoSPA: World War 2 Safety Posters by Manfred Reiss and G R Morris
 eye | opinion

German people of Polish-Jewish descent
British designers
British people of Polish-Jewish descent
1922 births
1987 deaths
German emigrants to the United Kingdom